Clinton Engle Howard (born April 20, 1959) is an American actor. He is the second son born to American actors Rance and Jean Howard, and younger brother of actor and director Ron Howard. His 200-plus acting credits include feature films such as The Waterboy and Apollo 13, as well as television series, such as Gentle Ben, The Baileys of Balboa, The Cowboys, and My Name Is Earl. He has appeared in many films directed by his brother, Ron, and had a small role in the 1967 animated film The Jungle Book. He is lead singer of his own band, The Kempsters, and also makes custom snow globes.

Early life
Born in Burbank, California, Howard's parents are actors Rance Howard and Jean Speegle and his older brother is actor and filmmaker Ron Howard.

Career

Television

Howard began his career when he was two, appearing in five episodes of The Andy Griffith Show, then starring his older brother Ron. He played Leon, a toddler in a cowboy outfit who wandered around Mayberry and silently offered people a bite of his sandwich, to which they would respond, "No thanks, Leon". Other early notable roles include his appearance on The Streets of San Francisco in the episode entitled "The House on Hyde Street", and The Virginian as Tommy, the proud owner of a new litter of pups in the episode entitled "Melanie".

In 1963, he appeared in the ABC medical drama Breaking Point in the role of four year old Mikey in the episode "The Gnu, Now Almost Extinct". He also played little Billy Taft, the nephew of Dr. Richard Kimble, in the season one episode of The Fugitive, "Home is the Hunted" (1964).

His first prominent role was as a regular on the series Gentle Ben (1967–69). He also starred in "The Boy Who Predicted Earthquakes", an episode segment of Rod Serling's Night Gallery, as Herbie, a ten-year-old boy who predicts the near future, and played Billy in the made for television version of John Steinbeck's The Red Pony, with Henry Fonda and Maureen O'Hara.

Howard appeared in various Star Trek episodes:
 In 1966, he appeared as the powerful but childlike alien Balok in "The Corbomite Maneuver," a season one episode of Star Trek: The Original Series (although not the first episode broadcast, it was the first episode of season one to be produced after the pilot episodes). The appearance is a well-remembered one in Star Trek history, and he briefly reprised the character in 2006 on Comedy Central's roast of William Shatner
 "Past Tense Part II," a Star Trek: Deep Space Nine episode
 "Acquisition," a season one episode of Star Trek: Enterprise
 "Will You Take My Hand," a season one episode of Star Trek: Discovery
 As a nod to Howard's prominent place in Star Trek culture, he played a part in Star Trek director J. J. Abrams' series Fringe; in the season one episode, "The Road Not Taken", playing a man who thought he was the son of Sarek of Vulcan. He discussed a fictitious plot by Romulans from the future, much like the one in Abrams' own Star Trek film. (In the next episode, Leonard Nimoy was revealed to be the mysterious character he was discussing.)

In 2003, Howard played Johnny Bark on Arrested Development in the season one episode "Key Decisions", which was produced and narrated by his brother, Ron. He was seen in an episode of Married... with Children as a creepy janitor. He played a car thief/murderer Tobias Lehigh Nagy in the season four Seinfeld episode "The Trip". Howard played Creepy Rodney in the season one My Name Is Earl episode "Stole a Badge", and he was a guest star in the season three episode of the NBC show Heroes "I Am Sylar".

Film
In his film debut The Courtship of Eddie's Father (1963), he played a child party guest standing on a table at his birthday party.

Howard also voiced Roo in Disney's animated shorts Winnie the Pooh and the Honey Tree (1966) and Winnie the Pooh and the Blustery Day (1968), which were later incorporated into The Many Adventures of Winnie the Pooh (1977), and Hathi Jr. in The Jungle Book (1967).

Howard has appeared in seventeen films directed by his brother, Ron Howard, including Ron's first directorial effort — a short film called Old Paint — when Clint was ten. He also starred in Ron's first full-length feature, Grand Theft Auto. Other roles in the elder Howard's films include: John Dexter in Cocoon (1985), Paul in Gung Ho (both film and TV series), pathologist Ricco in Backdraft (1991), Lou in Parenthood, Flynn in Far and Away (1992), flight controller Seymour Liebergot in Apollo 13 (1995), Ken in EDtv (1999), and Whobris in How the Grinch Stole Christmas (2000).

He also played Sheriff Purdy in The Missing (2003), Lloyd Davis in Frost/Nixon (2008), Herbert Trimpy in The Dilemma, and Paul Lucas in the episodes "Spider" and "We Interrupt This Program" of the HBO miniseries From the Earth to the Moon, which was produced by Ron.

He played Eaglebauer in Rock 'n' Roll High School, Usher in Get Crazy, Paco in The Waterboy, Arthur Lynne in Uwe Boll's Heart of America, cellmate Slinky in Tango & Cash, KJZZ disk jockey in That Thing You Do!, Johnson Ritter in the Austin Powers series, another flight controller in Night at the Museum: Battle of the Smithsonian, Nipples in Little Nicky (2000), Gregory Tudor in the low budget film Ice Cream Man (1995), Rughead in The Wraith (1986), Stanley Coopersmith in Evilspeak (1981), Kate the Caterer in The Cat in the Hat (2003), Doctor Koplenson in Halloween (2007), and appeared in the romantic comedies, Play the Game and Speed-Dating.

He also played Sanders in Alabama Moon and Dr. Owen in Nobody Gets Out Alive, which was written and directed by filmmaker Jason Christopher.

He appeared in Solo: A Star Wars Story, which his brother Ron directed.

Music
In 1981, Howard formed The Kempsters, a new wave rock and roll group that was composed mostly of his friends who were neighbors with him on Kemp Street. The band played regularly at Madame Wong's West. The band retired in 1983. Although The Kempsters never released an album while together, Howard has recently begun distributing No Brains At All, a CD  featuring four tracks the band recorded in various studios, and seven tracks recorded live on October 17, 1982, at Madame Wong's West.

Personal life
Howard has been married three times. He married his long term girlfriend Ann Marie Lynch in 1988. 

His second marriage with Melanie Sorich was for 22 years, from 1995 to 2017. The couple had no children.

On July 1, 2020, Howard married Kat C. Howard in a private wedding ceremony at The Little Church of the West in Las Vegas, Nevada. He is stepfather to her daughter.

Howard is a Republican (contrasting with his brother, Ron, a Democrat). On January 29, 2016, three days before the Iowa Caucuses, he endorsed United States Senator Ted Cruz of Texas for the Republican presidential nomination.

Howard was an avid golfer who played 150 rounds a year until hip replacements forced him to quit.

In 2015, Howard began creating one-of-a-kind snow globes that are occasionally featured on entertainment programs. He brought one with him for his appearance on The Tonight Show Starring Jimmy Fallon (with, as a guest, Howard's niece Bryce Dallas Howard).

Filmography

Film

Television

See also

References

External links

 
 
 

1959 births
Living people
20th-century American male actors
21st-century American male actors
American male child actors
American male film actors
American male television actors
American male voice actors
American people of Dutch descent
American people of English descent
American people of German descent
American people of Irish descent
American people of Scottish descent
California Republicans
Clint
Male actors from Burbank, California
Male actors from California
People from the San Fernando Valley